Jesse Alexander (born 1929 in Santa Barbara, California, died December 15, 2021, in Santa Barbara, California) was an American photographer who covered motorsports, portraits, birds and travel. He also published several books.

One of his first photo expeditions was in 1953 to the Carrera Panamericana race in Mexico. Since 1954, he covered large European races such as 24 Hours of Le Mans in France, and the Mille Miglia and Targa Florio of Italy. While in Europe he also photographed culture celebrities  for The New York Times, and was the European editor for Car and Driver magazine.

He exhibited at the Birmingham Museum of Art, the Akron Art Museum, and the Santa Barbara Museum of Art.

Books
Monaco: The Golden Age of the Grand Prix by Jesse Alexander, At Speed Press, 2014
Inside the Archives of Jesse Alexander, David Bull Publishing, 2010
Portraits: Photographs by Jesse Alexander, David Bull Publishing, 2008
Ferrari Grand Prix Moments: Formula One Photographs by Jesse Alexander, David Bull Publishing, 2007
Porsche Moments: Photographs from Europe and Mexico by Jesse Alexander, David Bull Publishing, 2006
Driven: The Racing Photography of Jesse Alexander  1954–1962, Chronicle Books, 2000
At Speed: Jesse Alexander, Bond/Parkhurst Books, 1972
Looking Back with Jesse Alexander, At Speed Press, 1972

Exhibitions
2016                 The Photographs of Jesse Alexander, at Petersen Automotive Museum, Los Angeles. Solo exhibition.
2007                 Made in Santa Barbara, at Santa Barbara Museum of Art, Santa Barbara. Group exhibition.
2000                 Drivers: Jesse Alexander, at Staley-Wise Gallery, New York. Solo exhibition.

References

1929 births
2021 deaths
American photographers
People from Santa Barbara, California
Artists from Santa Barbara, California